is a music group originating from Japan. The acoustic guitar duo is composed of Takuya Miura (born 5 April 1983) and Yoshinari Tokuoka (born on 15 July 1977), who formed in 2002.

They made their major debut in 2005 with their album "Let’s Go!!!", which generated sales figures of about 100,000 and ranked within the top 10 of Oricon's Instrumental Artist Debut Chart. Before that, they had released three indie albums.

The name itself comes from the combination of both short names of the band members, by combining the Japanese word for overbite, 'deppa', and the name of Tokuoka's previous band 'DERUPEPE'. Contrary to a popular rumour circulating among their fans, the two guitarists are not brothers. In their 2002 formation the pair joined with the Sony Music. They worked on insert songs for anime television series Honey and Clover.

Members 
 Miura Takuya (三浦拓也) - Depa (Born: Kobe, 5 April 1983)
 Tokuoka Yoshinari (徳岡慶也) - Pepe (Born: Kobe, 15 July 1977)

Discography

Indie 
 ACOUSTIC FRIENDS (5 February 2004)
 Hi-D!!
 La tanta
 真夜中の怪盗 Thief of Midnight
 水面に浮かぶ金魚鉢 Goldfish Bowl Floating on the Water
 風 Wind
 いつかみた道 The Road Seen Someday
 木漏れ陽の中で In the Sunshine Shining Through the Trees
 THIS WAY
 Sky! Sky! Sky! (15 July 2004)
 Sky! Sky! Sky!
 Sabamba
 さざなみ Ripple
 TIME
 微風 Breeze
 PASSION OF GRADATION (2 December 2004)
 激情メランコリック Passion Melancholic
 DUNK
 FRIENDS
 Snow Dance
 ありがとう。 Thank You.
 Fun Time

Single 
 SUMMER PARADE (20 July 2005)
 SUMMER PARADE
 B.B.D
 オールド・ビーチ Old Beach
 星の数だけ願いは届く Reach Many Wishes as the Number of the Stars
 Spur - WINTER VERSION'05/Swingin' Happy X'mas (シュプール －WINTER VERSION'05/Swingin' Happy X'mas) (30 November 2005)
 Spur - WINTER VERSION'05 (シュプール -WINTER VERSION '05)
 Swingin' Happy X'mas
 Lahaina (ラハイナ) (15 March 2006)
 ラハイナ Lahaina
 きっとまたいつか Surely Some Other Day
 JAC(K) IN THE BOX
 Night & Day: DEPAPEPE meets Honey and Clover (ハチミツとクローバー) (11 October 2006)
 Night & Day
 パステル通り Pastel Toori (Pastel Street)
 ハチロク Hachi Roku
 光ノサキへ Hikari no Saki he (Beyond the Light)
 Sakura Kaze (桜風) (21 February 2007)
 桜風 Sakura Wind
 DAYS
 Happy Shine
 KATANA (22 April 2009)
 KATANA
 KATANA staging Diggy-MO'
 HighRock!!
 雨音 Rain Sound

Mini album 
  Hi！Mode！！ (19 October 2005)
 哀愁バイオレット Sorrow Violet
 夕焼けサイクリング Sunset Cycling
 Harvest
 Tiger
 半月 Half Moon
 シュプール Ski Trace
 Morning Smile

Albums 
  Let's Go!!! (18 May 2005)
 Hi-D!!!
 START
 Wake Up!
 MTMM
 バタフライ Butterfly
 風見鶏 Weathercock
 時計じかけのカーニバル Clockwork Carnival
 雨上がり After the Rain
 Wedding Bell
 Over the Sea
 いい日だったね。 It was a Good Day.
 FLOW
  Ciao! Bravo!! (19 April 2006)
 キミドリ Yellowish green
 ラハイナ Lahaina
 Judgement
 SLOW SUNSET
 寝待ちの月 Moon's Bedtime Waiting
 さくら舞う Sakura Dancing
 伯爵の恋 Count's Love
 青春カムバック Youth Comeback
 きっとまたいつか (album version) Surely Some Other Day
 ブラボー・マーチ Bravo March
 SUNSHINE SURF!!
 T.M.G.
 ラハイナ (mahalo version)
 BEGINNING OF THE ROAD ～collection of early songs～ (25 April 2007)
 風 '07 ver. Wind
 La tanta cha cha cha ver.
 Sky! Sky! Sky! '07 ver.
 さざなみ splash ver. Ripple
 木漏れ陽の中で brilliant ver. In the Sunshine Shining Through the Trees
 真夜中の怪盗 失われた秘宝の謎 Thief of Midnight Mystery of the Lost Treasures
 激情メランコリック 情熱MIX Passion Melancholic Passion MIX
 いつかみた道 '07 ver. The Road Seen Someday
 DUNK studio session
 Snow Dance winter session
 THIS WAY B.O.R. ver.
 ありがとう。 for you ver. Thank you.
 SINGING　BIRD
 デパクラ (DEPACLA)　～DEPAPEPE PLAYS THE CLASSICS～ (28 November 2007)
 パッヘルベルのカノン Pachelbel's Canon in D
 2声のインヴェンション第４番 Bach's Invention No.4
 G線上のアリア Bach's Air on G String
 ピアノソナタ第8番 ハ短調 作品13 "悲愴"第2楽章 Beethoven’s Piano Sonata No. 8 in C minor, op. 13 "Pathetique"
 ジムノぺディ第1番 Satie's Gymnopedie No.1
 ボレロ Ravel's Bolero
  HOP! SKIP! JUMP! (2 April 2008)
 FESTA!!
 Ready! GO!!
 Great Escape
 禁じられた恋 Forbidden Love
 Horizon
 旅の空から、 The Journey from the Sky,
 Marine Drive
 ROSY
 a ボトム A Bottom
 VIVA! JUMP!
 GIGIO²
 桜風 Sakura Wind
 デパナツ (DEPANATSU) ～drive!drive!!drive!!!～ (30 July 2008)
 ラハイナ（CW version） Lahaina
 Sky! Sky! Sky!
 Over the Sea
 FLOW
 SUMMER PARADE
 SLOW SUNSET
 Happy Shine
 光ノサキへ Beyond the Light
 さざなみ splash ver. Ripple
 SUNSHINE SURF!!（CW version）
 星の数だけ願いは届く Reach Many Wishes as the Number of the Stars
 ひと夏の恋 Summer Romance
 Sky! Sky! Sky! '07 ver.
 デパフユ(DEPAFUYU)～ 晴れ 時どき 雪～ (26 November 2008)
 シュプール -WINTER VERSION '05
 Night & Day
 夕焼けサイクリング Sunset Cycling
 Snow Dance winter session
 TIME
 Dreams
 パステル通り Pastel Street
 散歩道 Promenade
 DAYS
 Morning Smile
 哀愁バイオレット Sorrow Violet
 きっとまたいつか Surely Some Other Day
 THIS WAY B.O.R. ver.
 晴れ時どき雪 Clear Sometimes Snowing
  Do! (3 June 2009)
 FAKE
 KATANA
 Sailing
 紫陽花 Hydrangea
 HighRock!!
 最後の晩餐 The Last Supper
 二人の写真 Photo of Two Persons
 orange
 Dolphindance
 ジャンボリー Jamboree
 PaPaPa
 真夏の疑惑 Doubt of Midsummer
 Quarrel
 Mint
 Special Lady～the wedding anthem～
 デパクラ 2 (DEPACLA 2)～DEPAPEPE PLAYS THE CLASSICS 2～ (2 December 2009)
 交響曲第９番～第４楽章 Beethoven's Symphony No.9, 4th Mouvement
 行進曲「威風堂々」 Elgar's Pomp and Circumstance March
 結婚行進曲 Mendelssohn's Wedding March
 グリーンスリーヴスによる幻想曲 Vaughan Williams's Fantasia on Greensleeves
 アダージョ・ト短調 Albinoni's Adagio in G Minor by Giazotto
 亡き王女のためのパヴァーヌ Ravel - Pavane pour une Infante défunte (Pavane for a Dead Princess)
 トルコ行進曲 Mozart's Turkish March
 天国と地獄 Offenbach's Orphée aux enfers (Orpheus in the Underworld) or widely known as Can-can dance
 夜想曲第２番 Chopin's Nocturne No.2 Op.9
 主よ、人の望みの喜びよ Bach's Jesu, Joy of Man's Desiring
 ONE (18 May 2011)
 恋水 Tears of Love
 Lion
 beautiful wind
 ONE
 Starry Night
 notes for Flora
 Route 128
 Hello
 Wind on the coastline
 Pride
 -Interlude-
 白い花 White flowers
 Acoustic & Dining (3 October 2012)
 UNION
 ツバメ 
 Memories ft.Coba
 Three Minutes Cooking
 SPARK!
 あの橋を渡ろう 
 Share My World feat.Sin(SINGULAR)
 always
 風薫る 
 Happy Birthday
 かがやける日々
 KISS (27 August 2014)
 Life is a Journey
 Kiss
 four
 S.E.L.
 Light of Hope
 Circle of Love
 Howl of the Wolf
 Leopard
 Interlude～ネムル森～Nemr forest
 スミレViolet
 あの日見た空The sky we saw that day
 青い鳥Blue Bird
 Sunburst
 かがやける日々
 Colors (12 April 2017)
 Color
 Letter from the forest
 Girl
 Diary
 Soda
 J.D.P.
 小鳥のキャロル
 旅立ちの日
 Reflection
 My hometown

DEPAPEKO (押尾コータロー×DEPAPEPE) 
 PICK POP! ～J-Hits Acoustic Covers～ (19 September 2018)
 チョコレイト・ディスコ Chocolate Disco (Perfume)
 恋 Koi (Love) (Gen Hoshino)
 Gee (Girls' Generation)
 夢芝居 Dream Theater (梅沢富美男)
 Dragon Night (SEKAI NO OWARI)
 TECHNOPOLIS (Yellow Magic Orchestra)
 恋するフォーチュンクッキー Koi Suru Fortune Cookie (The Fall-in-Love Fortune Cookie) (AKB48)
 ラブ・ストーリーは突然に Love Stories Are Sudden (Kazumasa Oda)
 ひとり Hitori (Gospellers)
 START (DEPAPEPE)
 翼 ～you are the HERO～ (Kotaro Oshio)
 For You

DVD 
 6 Color Rainbow - Video Clips Vol. 1 (25 January 2006)
 Ciao! Bravo!! The Movie!!! - DEPAPEPE meets Digital Hollywood (19 July 2006)
 ほろり二人旅 2007 (26 September 2007)
 DEPAPEPEデビュー５年記念ライブ「Merry 5 round」日比谷野外大音楽堂　2009年5月6日 (30 September 2009)

External links 
 Official site

Japanese musical groups
Sony Music Entertainment Japan artists
Musical groups from Hyōgo Prefecture
Japanese instrumental musical groups
Japanese musical duos
Musical groups established in 2002